The Split Rock River is a  river of Minnesota, in the United States. The name was used as early as 1825 and is believed to refer either to the steep-walled gorge carved by the river or to two cliffs east of the river mouth that appear split apart. An indigenous name for the river was Gininwabiho-zibi, meaning "War Eagle Iron River." The river's lower course flows through Split Rock Lighthouse State Park, and the Superior Hiking Trail ascends and descends both banks. There is a separate stream called Split Rock Creek nearby.

Geography
The East and West Split Rock River branches arise in wetlands near Legler Lake. Over the next  the river drops  in elevation, then drops  over the next mile. Only in its final mile does the river level out and slow before emptying into Lake Superior.

There are ten waterfalls on the river, although because they can only be reached by a moderate hike on the Superior Hiking Trail they are lightly visited.

History
From 1899 to 1906 the river basin was logged of its red and white pines.  The logging operation included the town of Splitrock, Minnesota, at the river mouth and a  rail line to carry lumber down to the lakeshore.  During the Mataafa Storm of November 28, 1905, seven ships were wrecked within a dozen miles of the Split Rock River, including the steel steamboat William Edenborn right at its mouth.  This prompted the construction of the Split Rock Lighthouse on a nearby cliff.

References

Minnesota Watersheds
USGS Hydrologic Unit Map - State of Minnesota (1974)

Rivers of Lake County, Minnesota
Rivers of Minnesota
Tributaries of Lake Superior
Northern Minnesota trout streams